The Old Lyme Congregational Church is located in Old Lyme, Connecticut.   The church is noted as a favorite subject of Old Lyme Art Colony painters. It is affiliated with the United Church of Christ.

History

The first Meeting House was built in 1665 and the first minister was Moses Noyes.  New buildings were constructed in 1689 and 1738.  The present building was erected in 1816-7 by architect Samuel Belcher, Belcher also designed the John Sill and William Noyes houses on Lyme Street. The building was burnt down in a July 3, 1907 fire, then rebuilt with help from artists at the Old Lyme art colony in 1908-9.

Five other Congregational churches were built on essentially the same design in the Connecticut towns of Milford (1823), Cheshire (the 1827 First Congregational Church of Cheshire), Litchfield (the 1829 First Congregational Church of Litchfield), Southington (1830), and Guilford (the 1830 First Congregational Church of Guilford). All six churches have front porticos with four fluted columns, the doors of all six have the same dimensions, all six steeples are of the same design and are surmounted by weathervanes that appear to have been cast from one mold, and all six churches have twenty-over-twenty double-hung windows. The similarities suggest that some of the building elements may have been prefabricated.

The building was restored circa 2001 by volunteers, including architect Stephen Lloyd.

Paintings

Impressionist Childe Hassam depicted the church in a series of three celebrated paintings from 1903 to 1906.  One hangs in the Parrish Art Museum in Southampton, New York.  Another is displayed in the Albright-Knox Art Gallery in Buffalo, New York. Hassam's paintings helped bring publicity to the Old Lyme art colony and helped tourism in the town. Other artists at the colony, including Charles Ebert and Everett Warner (in about 1911), also tried their hands at painting the church.

References

External links
 Official website of the First Congregational Church of Old Lyme 
Childe Hassam: American Impressionist, a full-text exhibition catalog from The Metropolitan Museum of Art, which contains material on Old Lyme

United Church of Christ churches in Connecticut
Old Lyme, Connecticut
Churches in New London County, Connecticut
Churches completed in 1817
19th-century United Church of Christ church buildings
20th-century United Church of Christ church buildings
Churches completed in 1909